Yoann Cathline (born 22 July 2002) is a French professional footballer who plays as a forward for Ligue 1 club Lorient.

Club career

Guingamp
Yoann Cathline came through the ranks of US Torcy, before joining the En Avant Guingamp in 2019, where he signed his first contract a year later.

After having already featured in the pro squad the previous season, he made his professional debut for Guingamp on 24 July 2021, coming on as a substitute in a 0–0 Ligue 2 away draw against Le Havre.

Lorient
On 5 September 2022, Cathline joined Lorient on a five-year deal.

References

External links

2002 births
Living people
People from Champigny-sur-Marne
French footballers
France youth international footballers
Association football forwards
Ligue 1 players
Ligue 2 players
En Avant Guingamp players
FC Lorient players